{{DISPLAYTITLE:C27H44O3}}
The molecular formula C27H44O3 (molar mass: 416.63 g/mol, exact mass: 416.329045) may refer to:
 1,25-Dihydroxycholecalciferol
 24,25-Dihydroxycholecalciferol
 Paricalcitol, an analog of vitamin D
 Sarsasapogenin
 Tacalcitol